Yongfeng station may refer to:
Yongfeng station (Beijing)
Yongfeng station (Chengdu)